The Tatar Dam is an earth-fill dam on the Peri River (a tributary of the Euphrates), near the village of Tatarköy in Kovancılar district of Elazığ Province, Turkey. Its primary purpose is hydroelectric power generation and is the sixth and last dam in the Peri River cascade, before Lake Keban. Construction on the dam began in 2008 and it began impounding its reservoir in early 2013. The power station was commissioned in late 2015. Its two generators were commissioned in February/March 2015. It is owned and operated by Limak Energy and Bilgin Energy.

See also

Seyrantepe Dam – upstream

References

Dams in Elazığ Province
Earth-filled dams
Roller-compacted concrete dams
Dams completed in 2015
Dams on the Peri River
2015 establishments in Turkey
Energy infrastructure completed in 2015
Hydroelectric power stations in Turkey
21st-century architecture in Turkey